Passepied (パスピエ, pasupie) is a five-member Japanese pop-rock band formed in Tokyo in 2009. They are signed with Nehan Records, an independent label under Universal Music Japan.

Overview
Passepied was formed by Tokyo University of the Arts graduate and keyboardist, Narita Haneda.

Discography

Singles

Mini albums 
{| class="wikitable" style="font-size:small"
|-
! !! Release Date !! Title
|-
! 1
| March 2010
| |-
! 2
| November 23, 2011
| |-
! 3
| July 27, 2012
| "ONOMIMONO"|-
! 4
| October 18, 2017
| |-
! 5
| April 4, 2018
| |}

 Full Albums 

 English Albums 

 Live albums 

 Compilation albums 

 Other Works

 Videography 

 Live DVDs 

 Books 
 ''' (September 20, 2014)

References

Musical groups from Tokyo
Musical groups established in 2009